Louisiana Highway 88 (LA 88) is a state highway located in Iberia Parish, Louisiana.  It runs  in an east–west direction from LA 89 at Lozes to LA 182 at Burke.

The route connects U.S. Highway 90 (US 90) and LA 182, its de facto business route, between Lafayette and New Iberia.  LA 88 also connects US 90 to Delcambre, a town east of Abbeville, via LA 89.  It runs through a mixture of older rural and newer suburban development.

Route description
From the west, LA 88 begins at an intersection with LA 89 located at a point in northwestern Iberia Parish known as Lozes.  LA 89, heading north from Delcambre, makes a sharp turn from Coteau Road west onto Youngsville Road to head toward the small city of Youngsville.  LA 88 proceeds straight ahead on Coteau Road for  then curves to the east.  After , LA 88 passes through an interchange with US 90, the future route of I-49, which connects to Lafayette on the northwest and Morgan City on the southeast.

East of US 90, LA 88 makes a jog to the south and back to the northeast.   later, the route crosses the BNSF/Union Pacific Railroad line. LA 182 parallels the route of US 90 to Lafayette and Morgan City.

The route is classified by the Louisiana Department of Transportation and Development (La DOTD) as an urban collector from the western terminus to Parish Road 509 and a rural major collector to the eastern terminus. LA 88 is an undivided two-lane highway for the majority of its route, widening briefly to a divided four-lane highway through the interchange with US 90.

History
In the original Louisiana Highway system in use between 1921 and 1955, the modern LA 88 made up the northern portion of State Route 448.  Route 448 followed the present route of LA 89 from Delcambre north to Lozes, then LA 88 from there to Burke.

LA 88 was created with the 1955 Louisiana Highway renumbering, and its route has remained the same to the present day.  However, the eastern terminus in Burke was originally a junction with US 90.  After the relocation of US 90 through the area around 1969, the former alignment became LA 182, which now serves as the eastern terminus of LA 88.

Future
Under this plan of "right-sizing" the state highway system, the entire route of LA 88 is proposed for deletion as it does not meet a significant interurban travel function.

Major intersections

See also

References

External links

Maps / GIS Data Homepage, Louisiana Department of Transportation and Development

0088
Transportation in Iberia Parish, Louisiana